Björn Rudström (born 10 May 1954 in Härnösand, Sweden) is a Swedish curler and curling coach.

In 1978 he was inducted into the Swedish Curling Hall of Fame.

Teams

Record as a coach of national teams

Private life
Rudström is from family of curlers. His younger brother Håkan was Björn's teammate when they won the World and European championships. Håkan's daughter Amalia played for Sweden at the 2012 Winter Youth Olympics.

References

External links
 

Living people
1954 births
People from Härnösand
Swedish male curlers
World curling champions
European curling champions
Swedish curling champions
Swedish curling coaches
Sportspeople from Västernorrland County
20th-century Swedish people